

Belgium
Belgian Congo – Auguste Tilkens, Governor-General of the Belgian Congo (1927–1934)

France
 French Somaliland – Pierre Aimable Chapon-Baissac, Governor of French Somaliland (1924–1932)
 Guinea –
 Louis François Antonin, acting Lieutenant-Governor of Guinea (1929–1931)
 Robert Paul Marie de Guise, Lieutenant-Governor of Guinea (1931–1932)

Japan
 Karafuto –
Shinobu Agata, Governor-General of Karafuto (9 July 1929 – 17 December 1931)
Masao Kishimoto, Governor-General of Karafuto (17 December 1931 – 5 July 1932)
 Korea –
Saitō Makoto, Governor-General of Korea (1929–1931)
Kazushige Ugaki, Governor-General of Korea (1931–1936)
 Taiwan –
Ishizuka Eizō, Governor-General of Taiwan (30 July 1929 – January 1931)
Masahiro Ōta, Governor-General of Taiwan (16 January 1931 – March 1932)

Portugal
 Angola –
 José Dionísio Carneiro de Sousa e Faro, High Commissioner of Angola (1930–1931)
 Eduardo Ferreira Viana, High Commissioner of Angola (1931–1934)

United Kingdom
 Malta Colony
John Philip Du Cane, Governor of Malta (1927–1931)
David Campbell, Governor of Malta (1931–1936)
 Northern Rhodesia – Sir James Crawford Maxwell, Governor of Northern Rhodesia (1927–1932)

Notes

Colonial governors
Colonial governors
1931